Holly Nielle Aitchison (born 21 February 1997) is an English rugby union player. She has played representative rugby at the World Cup, Olympic Games, and Six Nations Championships.

Personal life
Born in Southport, she attended St Peter’s Primary School and Range High School in Formby where she was coached by Gill Burns.  Aitchison is the daughter of former England Saxon and rugby coach Ian Aitchison.

Career
She played for Waterloo Ladies as a junior  and Gloucester-Hartpury Women and Lichfield Ladies. She was a two-time U18 Rugby Europe Women's Sevens champion with England and a member of the squad that lifted the Challenge Trophy at the 2018 Rugby World Cup Sevens.

In September 2020 she joined Saracens Women. In 2021 she played for the Great Britain Rugby Sevens squad in the delayed 2020 Summer Games in Tokyo, where they finished fourth. In October 2021, she scored a try on her debut for the England 15s team.

She was named in the England squad for the delayed 2021 Rugby World Cup held in New Zealand in October and November 2022. She was named in the starting 15 for the World Cup final against New Zealand.

References

1997 births
Living people
English female rugby league players
English rugby union players
Olympic rugby sevens players of Great Britain
Rugby sevens players at the 2020 Summer Olympics
Rugby league players from Southport
Rugby union players from Southport
England international women's rugby sevens players
Saracens Women rugby players